Backroads is a 1977 Australian film directed by Phillip Noyce. Two strangers – one white (Jack), one Aboriginal (Gary) – steal a car in western New South Wales and drive around the coast. The original characters came from a story by Adelaide writer John Emery, with whom Noyce had worked on a short film. Australian reviews of the film were mixed, and it opened commercially in only one cinema.

Plot
Jack and Gary steal a car and head off around the back roads of Western New South Wales. They pickup a trio of fellow travellers – Gary's uncle Joe, a French hitchhiker and an embittered woman.

Joe drunkenly shoots a stranger and they are chased by police. The police arrest Joe and Jack and shoot Gary.

Cast
Bill Hunter as Jack
Gary Foley as Gary
Zac Martin as Joe
Terry Camilleri as Jean Claude
Julie McGregor as Anna
Essie Coffey as Aboriginal Woman
Allan Penney as Shopkeeper

Production
John Emery had written one of Noyce's short films at film school, Caravan Park, and pitched him another story, The First Day of Spring, about a young aboriginal. They developed the script together. Gary Foley agreed to act provided that he would be responsible for the film's indigenous content.

The film was mostly shot on location near Bourke and Brewarrina in western New South Wales and was funded in part by a $25,000 grant from the Creative Development Branch of the Australian Film Commission. Shooting finished in April 1977 when the finance ran out. Noyce applied to the Australian Film Commission for money to finish the film, however he decided instead to launch Backroads at the Sydney Film Festival in 1977.

Reception
The film received mixed reviews in Australia but achieved a better response overseas.

References

External links 
 

Backroads at Oz Movies

1977 films
1977 drama films
Australian drama films
1970s English-language films
Films directed by Phillip Noyce
Films set in New South Wales
1977 directorial debut films